Ghost runner, Ghost Runner, The Ghost Runner or Ghostrunner may refer to:

 John Tarrant (athlete) (1932–1975), English long-distancer runner nicknamed "The Ghost Runner"
 In baseball or softball:
  Invisible runner rule - a device used when there are not enough players
  Extra innings - referencing the World Baseball Softball Confederation tiebreaker where runners are at second base, and sometimes, first base to start an inning
 Ghostrunner, a 2020 video game
 The Ghost Runner, the book which won Bill Jones the 2012 British Sports Book Award for Best New Writer
 The Ghost Runner, a 2014 novel by Jamal Mahjoub
 Ghost Runner, name of Marvel Comics character Ghost Rider (Johnny Blaze) in an alternate reality
 "Ghost Runner", a track from Oceana, a 2011 studio album by keyboardist Derek Sherinian